Nagpal is an Indian surname that may refer to
Amitosh Nagpal, Indian film actor, screenwriter and lyricist
Deepshikha Nagpal (born 1968), Indian actress 
Devendra Nagpal, Indian politician 
Durga Shakti Nagpal (born 1985), Indian civil servant 
Harish Nagpal (born 1964), Indian politician 
Harit Nagpal (born 1961), Indian businessman 
Mahander Nagpal (born 1959), Indian politician
Nisha Nagpal, Indian television actress 
Nirmala Nagpal, Indian dance choreographer
Radhika Nagpal, Indian computer scientist
Rajat Nagpal
Vinod Nagpal, Indian film actor and classical singer

Indian surnames
Surnames of Indian origin
Hindu surnames